Mindaugas Malinauskas (born 11 August 1983 in Vilnius) is a retired Lithuanian football goalkeeper and current goalkeeper coach of FK Riteriai.

Malinauskas has made two appearances for the Lithuania national football team.

Career
Malinauskas started his career with Zalgiris Vilnius debuting in the 2004 season. After a two-year spell with FBK Kaunas he moved to Latvia, signing for FC Tranzit in 2009. He then played in Hungary for two years and in 2012 he returned to the A Lyga.

Later career
In 2017, Malinauskas returned to his hometown, Vilnius, and joined FK Panerys (2017). He was also hired as a goalkeeper coach for Futbolo Mokykla „Ateitis“, a football school in Vilnius. He later played for FK Nevėžis Kėdainiai (2018–19), FM Ateitis (2019) and Rings-Avelita (2019) before retiring at the end of 2019.In January 2020, 36-years old Malinauskas was hired as goalkeeper coach at FK Riteriai.

References

External links
Mindaugas Malinauskas at Lietuvos Futbolas

1983 births
Living people
Footballers from Vilnius
Lithuanian footballers
Lithuania international footballers
Association football goalkeepers
FK Žalgiris players
FBK Kaunas footballers
FK Šilutė players
FC Tranzīts players
Diósgyőri VTK players
Debreceni VSC players
FC Šiauliai players
FK Atlantas players
FK Šilas players
A Lyga players
Latvian Higher League players
Nemzeti Bajnokság I players
Lithuanian expatriate footballers
Expatriate footballers in Latvia
Lithuanian expatriate sportspeople in Latvia
Expatriate footballers in Hungary
Lithuanian expatriate sportspeople in Hungary